David March  may refer to:

 David March (actor) (1925-1999), English actor
 David March (rugby league) (born 1979), English former professional rugby league footballer